Yozgat Clock Tower is situated in the middle of the square in Yozgat city center, Turkey. It was built in 1908 and is made of cut stone in six tiers with a balcony around the upper part.

Yozgat